Corteolona is a frazione of the  comune (municipality) of Corteolona e Genzone in the Province of Pavia in the Italian region Lombardy, located about 40 km southeast of Milan and about 15 km east of Pavia.  It was a separate comune until 2016. 

 

Cities and towns in Lombardy